My Favorite Murder is an American podcast hosted by Karen Kilgariff and Georgia Hardstark. My Favorite Murder released its first episode on January 13, 2016.

The podcast format includes regular episodes, "minisodes", celebrity hometowns, and recorded live shows. Minisodes usually consist of listeners' stories, often referred to as "hometown murders," regardless of the type of story told. Celebrity hometowns involve Karen and Georgia sitting down with celebrity guests to hear their stories, from hometown murders to personal accounts of mayhem to legendary family lore. Live shows and regular shows share a common numbering sequence while minisodes follow a separate numbering system. Live shows are not given a number unless they are then released as an episode of My Favorite Murder.

List

See also
 List of My Favorite Murder live shows

References

External links
 Episodes on the podcasts official website

My Favorite Murder